Red Robin Gourmet Burgers, Inc., more commonly known as Red Robin Gourmet Burgers and Brews or simply Red Robin, is an American chain of casual dining restaurants founded in September 1969 in Seattle, Washington. In 1979, the first franchised Red Robin restaurant was opened in Yakima, Washington. Red Robin's headquarters are in Greenwood Village, Colorado. As of August 2020, the company had over 570 restaurants in operation with 90 being operated as a franchise.

History 
The original Red Robin stood at the corner of Furhman and Eastlake Avenues E. in Seattle, at the southern end of the University Bridge. This building dated from 1940 and was first called Sam's Tavern. The owner, Sam, sang in a barbershop quartet and could frequently be heard singing the song "When the Red, Red Robin (Comes Bob, Bob, Bobbin' Along)." He liked the song so much that he eventually changed the name to Sam's Red Robin.

In 1969, local Seattle restaurant entrepreneur Gerry Kingen bought and expanded the restaurant. The business dropped the "Sam's" and became Red Robin. The first restaurant was 1,200 sq ft (110 m2). It was a favored hangout for University of Washington students. Kingen continued to operate the location as a tavern for a few years, but later added hamburgers to the menu, eventually giving fans 28 different burgers to choose from, and sales increased.

After ten years of building the Red Robin concept, Kingen decided to franchise it, which proved to be significant in the development of the chain. The chain drew its strength through franchising and through one franchisee in particular. Kingen's association with the company he founded later ended, but the franchising system endured, creating disciples of the gourmet burger format that extended the physical presence and geographic reach of the enterprise far beyond the efforts of its creator.

In 1979, Kingen sold Michael and Steve Snyder the rights to open a Red Robin in Yakima, Washington, and The Snyder Group Company became Red Robin's first franchisee. In 1980, Red Robin opened a restaurant in Portland, Oregon. In 1983, Red Robin adopted a mascot named Red. In 1985, Red Robin had 175 restaurants when the corporate headquarters was moved from downtown Seattle to Irvine, California after CEO Kingen sold a controlling interest in Red Robin Corp. to Skylark Corporation of Japan and where Michael Snyder had Red Robin offices. With marginal successes and poor financial performance under Skylark's management, Kingen, then a minority owner, in 1995 stepped back into Red Robin with Michael Snyder to nurse the company back to profitability. In 2000, the company opened its 150th restaurant. The headquarters was moved to the Denver Tech Center.  In 2000, Red Robin merged with the Snyder Group, and Snyder became the company's president, chairman, and CEO. Snyder took the company public in 2002.

The first Red Robin in the Chicago area opened in 2001 at Woodfield Mall in Schaumburg, Illinois. Additional locations opened in Warrenville and Wheaton that year.

The original Red Robin closed on March 21, 2010, due to prohibitive maintenance costs for the old building. It was demolished on August 28, 2014.

As of the fiscal year 2015, the company had 538 restaurants with a revenue of US$1.25 billion. To expand their reach, Red Robin added a "simplified" line of restaurants called Red Robin's Burger Works featuring quick service and with locations in Washington, D.C., Illinois, Ohio, and Colorado. These restaurants, launched in 2011, were mostly closed in 2016; three were rebranded as Red Robin Express to differentiate them from full-service locations.

On December 2, 2018, Michael Snyder died by suicide. In September 2019, Paul J.B. Murphy III was appointed president, Chief Executive Officer, and a member of the Company's Board of Directors, effective October 3, 2019. The following month, the company announced plans to close its five locations in Alberta, Canada, by early December.

In 2021, Red Robin refocused its efforts on growth in its home state of Washington, opening a new location in Federal Way, Washington on November 15. The following November, the company closed its location in Baton Rouge, Louisiana and finished pulling all of its location out of the Boston area.

See also 

 List of casual dining restaurant chains
 List of hamburger restaurants

References

External links 

1969 establishments in Washington (state)
Companies based in Greenwood Village, Colorado
Companies listed on the Nasdaq
Hamburger restaurants in the United States
Restaurant chains in the United States
Restaurants established in 1969
Restaurants in Colorado
Restaurants in Seattle
2002 initial public offerings